Hellinsia mineti is a moth of the family Pterophoridae. It is known from Madagascar.

This species has a wingspan of 24 mm for the female (wing length 11 mm).

References

mineti
Moths of Madagascar
Moths of Africa
Moths described in 1994